Rasskazovo is the name of several inhabited localities in Russia.

Urban localities
Rasskazovo, a town in Tambov Oblast

Rural localities
Rasskazovo, Republic of Mordovia, a settlement in Semileysky Selsoviet of Kochkurovsky District in the Republic of Mordovia; 
Rasskazovo, Novosibirsk Oblast, a selo in Karasuksky District of Novosibirsk Oblast; 
Rasskazovo, Primorsky Krai, a selo in Khankaysky District of Primorsky Krai
Rasskazovo, Tver Oblast, a village in Kholmetskoye Rural Settlement of Oleninsky District in Tver Oblast